Forty-eight of the fifty U.S. states have one or more state songs, a type of regional anthem, which are selected by each state legislature as a symbol (or emblem) of that particular U.S. state.

Some U.S. states have more than one official state song, and may refer to some of their official songs by other names; for example, Arkansas officially has two state songs, plus a state anthem and a state historical song. Tennessee has the most state songs, with 10 official state songs and an official bicentennial rap.

Arizona has a song that was written specifically as a state anthem in 1915, as well as the 1981 country hit "Arizona", which it adopted as the alternate state anthem in 1982.

Two individuals, Stephen Foster, and John Denver, have written or co-written two state songs. Foster's two state songs, "Old Folks at Home" (better known as "Swanee Ribber" or "Suwannee River"), adopted by Florida, and "My Old Kentucky Home", are among the best-known songs in the U.S. In 2007, the Colorado Senate passed a resolution to make Denver's trademark 1972 hit "Rocky Mountain High" one of the state's two official state songs, along with "Where the Columbines Grow". In 2014, the West Virginia Legislature approved a resolution to make Denver's "Take Me Home, Country Roads" one of four official state songs of West Virginia.
Additionally, Woody Guthrie wrote or co-wrote two state folk songs – "Roll On, Columbia, Roll On" and "Oklahoma Hills" – but they have separate status from the official state songs of Washington and Oklahoma, respectively.  Other well-known state songs include "Yankee Doodle", "You Are My Sunshine", "Rocky Top", and "Home on the Range"; a number of others are popular standards, including "Oklahoma" (from the Rodgers and Hammerstein musical), Hoagy Carmichael's "Georgia on My Mind", "Tennessee Waltz", "Missouri Waltz", and "On the Banks of the Wabash, Far Away". Many of the others are much less well-known, especially outside the state.

New Jersey has never adopted a state song. In 2021, Maryland removed the official status of "Maryland, My Maryland" due to pro-Confederate language deemed racist, but did not establish a replacement. Virginia's previous state song, "Carry Me Back to Old Virginny", adopted in 1940, was later rescinded in 1997 due to language deemed racist by the Virginia General Assembly. In 2015, "Our Great Virginia" was made the new state song of Virginia.

New Mexico has two songs in Spanish:"Así Es Nuevo México" is the official Spanish State Song while "New Mexico - Mi Lindo Nuevo Mexico" is the State Bilingual Song.   

Iowa's ("The Song of Iowa") uses the tune from the song "O Tannenbaum" as the melody for their official state song.

State songs

Federal district songs

Territory songs

See also

List of U.S. state, district, and territorial insignia
Lists of United States state symbols
List of regional anthems

References

External links

State
Lists of anthems
Lists of songs
Songs
Songs
American music-related lists
Songs